Lenke Almási (born 22 March 1965) is a Hungarian gymnast. She competed in six events at the 1980 Summer Olympics.

She is married to György Guczoghy.

References

1965 births
Living people
Hungarian female artistic gymnasts
Olympic gymnasts of Hungary
Gymnasts at the 1980 Summer Olympics
Gymnasts from Budapest